Ivy Bridge may refer to:

Places
 Ivybridge, a town in Devon, England, a bridge there, and a painting of said bridge
 Ivybridge railway station
 Ivybridge Community College, a secondary school
 Ivybridge Priory, a former monastic house
 Ivybridge Town F.C., an amateur football club
 Ivybridge RFC, a rugby union club
 Ivybridge (Isleworth), a locality in West London formerly called Mogden

Other uses
 Ivy Bridge (microarchitecture), the codename of an Intel microarchitecture released in 2012
 Ivy Bridge College, a US-based online institution